Leonid Isaakovich Vail (12 May 1883 – 23 January 1945) was a painter and art theorist from the Russian Empire. He was born in Vinnytsia, in the Podolia Governorate of the Russian Empire, to a family of Russian-Jewish Traders. Vail spent his childhood in Odessa, where he graduated at Grekov Odessa Art school, later enrolling at the Imperial Academy of Arts, St.Petersburg. Vail began painting studies (life-drawing, sketching and anatomy) at the age of 17.

It was during his student years in St.Petersburg that he witnessed the events of the 1905 Bloody Sunday Massacre. According to his manuscripts this had a profound effect on his work, ‘Art in its current form only serves to empower the higher classes, we must look elsewhere if we are to create an art that is our own’.

Vail spent the pre-war years between Germany and Russia, teaching at the Munich Academy of Fine Arts and eventually emigrating to Zurich in order to flee rising political tensions. A strong and vocal proponent of the anti-war movement, Vail remained a pacifist his entire life, frequently contributing articles and essays to Russian periodicals, including the communist affiliated  Pravda, decrying what he considered an abhorrent misuse of power from all sides.

In Zurich, 1916, Vail attended the inaugural Cabaret Voltaire, where he met the likeminded Dadaists, producing a series of absurdist collages with Tristan Tzara and Sophie Taeuber. Vail’s most politically significant meeting of the time, however, was his passing acquaintance and correspondence with Lenin who often frequented the Zurich Library where Vail would write.

After WWI, Vail lived in France until he was exiled in 1927 for political dissension, at which point all known records and correspondence cease in what was erroneously reported as a political assassination. He was found dead in Mexico City circa 1945, he died of natural causes.

Painters from the Russian Empire
Emigrants from the Russian Empire to Switzerland
1883 births
1945 deaths
Artists from Vinnytsia